Victor Stewart Kaleoaloha Houston (July 22, 1876 — July 31, 1959) was an American politician and naval officer who served in the United States Congress representing the Territory of Hawaii.

Education and naval career
Born in San Francisco, California, he was the son of United States Navy Rear Admiral Edwin Samuel Houston and Caroline Poor Kahikiola Brickwood, who was part Native Hawaiian.

Houston attended Real Schule in Dresden, Saxony then at the Cantonal College in Lausanne, Switzerland.  He returned to the United States where he attended Force School in Washington, DC and then Werntz Preparatory School in Annapolis, Maryland.  In 1897, Houston obtained a degree and commission as a naval officer from the United States Naval Academy.  He retired from active service in the armed forces in 1926 with the rank of commander.

World War II service
With the attack of Honolulu on December 7, 1941, Houston was recalled up to duty as a naval officer, and remained in the Navy until March 1, 1945.  He rose through the ranks to become a captain on June 9, 1943.

Politics
Houston moved to Hawaii in 1909 where he became active with the Hawaii Republican Party.  From March 4, 1927 to March 3, 1933, Houston served several terms as a Congressional delegate for the territory to the United States House of Representatives.  He lost a bid for reelection and retired from politics.  He was also a delegate to the Republican National Conventions in 1928 and 1932.

Death
He died in Honolulu, Hawaii on July 31, 1959, just three weeks before statehood, and was buried in Oahu Cemetery.

See also
List of Asian Americans and Pacific Islands Americans in the United States Congress

References

1876 births
1959 deaths
United States Naval Academy alumni
United States Navy officers
Delegates to the United States House of Representatives from the Territory of Hawaii
Republican Party members of the United States House of Representatives from Hawaii
20th-century American politicians
United States Navy personnel of World War II
Hawaii Republicans
Burials at Oahu Cemetery
American people of Native Hawaiian descent
Native Hawaiian politicians